Constantin Werner (born January 3, 1969, Erlangen) is a German artist, writer, director and producer of film, TV, theater and music videos.

Constantin Werner's first feature film Dead Leaves had its premiere at the 1998 AFI International Film Festival in Los Angeles. The same year it received the award for Best Feature Film EXPO 1998 at the Figuera da Foz International Film Festival in Portugal. In 1999 it was screened at the Mar del Plata International Film Festival in Argentina, the  Gothenburg International Film Festival in Sweden and the Beta 2.0 Film Festival in Berlin. Dead Leaves was released in the US by Cult Epics/RYKO/Time Warner in May 2005.

His second feature film The Pagan Queen (2009), a historic drama with fantasy elements based on the legend of Libuše, the Slavic queen of 8th century Bohemia, was released theatrically in the Czech Republic in October 2009 after its premiere at the Estepona Fantastic Film Festival in Spain, where it won the Silver Unicorn award for best original score. Since then the film has been released in over a dozen countries including the United States, Canada, Australia, Germany and Russia.

Constantin Werner's producing credits include the action TV-series Puma, directed by martial arts legend Donnie Yen, for the German network RTL, the independent film Fireflies (starring Kate Mara, Dan Frazer and Isabel Glasser) and the 2004 Cult Epics release Bettie Page: Dark Angel. His stage directing credits include his play Box for the New York City theater La MaMa ETC in 1996, and the 2002 West Coast premiere of Pulitzer Prize nominee Adam Rapp's play Blackbird at Theater Theater, Los Angeles.

His music video credits include works for the LA bands Scarling, Versailles (musician), Gliss, The Deep Eynde, Punk Bunny, Jasmine Ash and the Sixth Chamber.

The first public showing of his artwork was at the Red Dot Miami Art Fair December 2019 through blu Egg Interiors & Art Gallery. This was followed in December 2020 by his first solo art exhibition Lost Souls with Wönzimer Gallery, Los Angeles and the 2021 group show Salon de Imperfectionism.

He is the creator and writer of the graphic novel One Night in Prague, which was illustrated by Tadd Galusha. The book was picked up by Keenspot and was at first sold in three separate comic issues in 2022. The full length version will be published through Simon & Schuster in 2023.

His next feature film In the Lost Lands started pre production in August 2022 and is scheduled to be filmed in Poland starting November 2022. In the Lost Lands was written by Constantin Werner and is based on a story by George R.R. Martin , adapted by Constantin Werner and Paul W.S. Anderson who is also directing. It will star Milla Jovovich and Dave Bautista.

References

External links 

 http://www.constantinwerner.com
 http://www.rusalkafilm.com

1969 births
Living people
Mass media people from Bavaria
People from Erlangen